The 2008 NCAA Division II football season, part of college football in the United States organized by the National Collegiate Athletic Association at the Division II level, began on August 29, 2009, and concluded with the NCAA Division II Football Championship on December 12, 2009 at Braly Municipal Stadium in Florence, Alabama, hosted by the University of North Alabama. The Northwest Missouri State Bearcats defeated the Grand Valley State, 30–23, to win their third Division II national title.

The Harlon Hill Trophy was awarded to Joique Bell, running back from Wayne State.

Conference and program changes

Lake Erie completed their transition to Division II and became eligible for the postseason.

Conference standings

Super Region 1

Super Region 2

Super Region 3

Super Region 4

Conference summaries

Postseason
The 2009 NCAA Division II National Football Championship playoffs involved 24 schools playing in a single-elimination tournament to determine the national champion of men's NCAA Division II college football.

The tournament began on November 14, 2009 and will conclude on December 13, 2009 with the 2009 NCAA Division II National Football Championship game at Braly Municipal Stadium near the campus of the University of North Alabama in Florence, Alabama.

Participants

Bids by conference

Playoff format
The first-round games were conducted on the campus of one of the competing institutions as determined by the NCAA Division II Football Committee. Two teams in each super regional earned first-round byes. The first-round winners advanced to face a bye team in their super regional. Second-round winners met in the quarterfinals and quarterfinal winners advanced to play in the semifinals.

First-round, second-round, quarterfinal and semifinal games were played on the campus of one of the competing institutions as determined by the NCAA Division II Football Committee. The home team at the championship was determined by the Division II Football Committee and the Shoals National Championship Committee.

National television coverage
The semifinal games were broadcast on ESPN, ESPN360, and CBS College Sports on December 5.

The championship game was played at Braly Municipal Stadium in Florence, Alabama and broadcast live on ESPN2 on December 12.

Tournament Notes

Final standings

Bracket and standings

Super Regional 1

Super Regional 4

Super Regional 3

Super Regional 2

Semifinals and championship

Individual game results

Round 1

Saginaw Valley vs. Nebraska–Kearney

Hillsdale vs. Minn. St. Mankato

Arkansas Tech vs. UNC-Pembroke

West Alabama vs. Albany State

Edinboro vs. East Stroudsburg

Fayetteville State vs. California (PA)

Tarleton State vs. Texas A&M - Kingsville

Abilene Christian vs. Midwestern State

Round 2

Nebraska–Kearney vs. Minnesota Duluth

Hillsdale vs. Grand Valley State

Arkansas Tech vs. North Alabama

West Alabama vs. Carson-Newman

Edinboro vs. West Liberty
An NCAA Division II record for combined points (147) and yards (1,394) was set during the game. Edinboro quarterback Trevor Harris set the Division II record for passing, completing 50 of 76 passes for 630 yards and 5 touchdowns.

California (PA) vs. Shippensburg

Tarleton State vs. Central Washington

Abilene Christian vs. Northwest Missouri

Super Regional finals

Super Region 1: California (PA) vs. West Liberty

Super Region 2: Carson-Newman vs. North Alabama

Super Region 3: Grand Valley State vs. Minnesota Duluth

Super Region 4: Northwest Missouri vs. Central Washington

Semifinals

Carson-Newman vs. Grand Valley St.

California (PA) vs. Northwest Missouri

Championship

See also
2009 NCAA Division II National Football Championship game
 2009 NCAA Division I FBS football season
 2009 NCAA Division I FCS football season
 2009 NCAA Division III football season
 2009 NAIA football season

References